The Trixy Trixformer is an Austrian roadable aircraft autogyro/electric motorcycle designed and produced by Trixy Aviation Products of Dornbirn, introduced in 2014. The vehicle is supplied complete and ready-to-fly.

Design and development
The Trixformer is based upon a two-wheeled electric motorcycle chassis as a land vehicle and is designed to add modular flying components. It can be equipped and flown as an autogyro, with the plug-in gyro module. Helicopter or fixed wing aircraft modules were under development in 2015.

As an autogyro, the Trixformer features a single main rotor, a two-seats-in tandem open cockpit with a windshield, tricycle landing gear, plus a tail caster and a four-cylinder, liquid and air-cooled, four stroke  Trixy 912 Ti engine in pusher configuration.

The aircraft fuselage is made from metal tubing and composites.

Unlike many other autogyro builders Trixy Aviation uses a swash plate in its rotor head designs, rather than a tilt head. This makes the design more sensitive to fly and requires special type training.

Specifications (Trixformer)

See also
List of rotorcraft

References

External links

Trixformer
Roadable aircraft
2010s Austrian sport aircraft
Single-engined pusher autogyros
Aircraft first flown in 2014
Electric motorcycles